LaMichael Keondrae "LaMike" James (born October 22, 1989) is a former American football running back. He played college football for the University of Oregon and was drafted by the San Francisco 49ers in the second round of the 2012 NFL Draft.

The 2010 season was a breakout one for James, as he rushed for 1,731 yards, the highest in the nation. He finished third in balloting for the Heisman Trophy that year and received the Doak Walker Award. In 2011, he became Oregon's career rushing leader and rushed for a school-record 1,805 yards. He was considered to be one of the top running backs throughout his college career, with his 5,082 total rushing yards placing him 2nd in Pac-12 Conference history and 14th in NCAA history.

High school career
James attended Liberty-Eylau High School in Texarkana, Texas, where he played running back. As a sophomore, he rushed for 643 yards and 10 touchdowns on 76 carries. In his junior season, he totaled 1,600 yards and 16 touchdowns on 229 carries while adding 500 yards receiving and three touchdowns on 33 receptions. James continued his dominance during his senior campaign to the tune of 2,043 yards and 24 touchdowns on 230 touches, averaging 8.9 yards per carry.

Considered a four-star recruit by Rivals.com, James was listed as the No. 12 all-purpose back in the nation in 2008.

College career

2009 season
James attended the University of Oregon, where he played for coach Chip Kelly's Oregon Ducks football team from 2009 to 2011. After the suspension of LeGarrette Blount, James became the starting running back for the Ducks in 2009. He helped the Ducks to upset victories over Utah and California with 152 and 118 rushing yards, respectively. He again rushed for over 100 yards on October 10 against UCLA with 152 yards on 20 carries.

Once again, James eclipsed the 100 yard mark with 154 yards rushing on 15 carries against Washington on October 24, and on October 31 with 183 yards to upset then #5 USC. He led all BCS-conference running backs with 6.9 yards per carry.

On December 7, 2009, James was named Pac-10 Offensive Freshman of the Year.

2010 season

On March 9, 2010, head coach Chip Kelly announced that James would be suspended for the season opening game of the 2010 season, following his guilty plea for physical harassment against his former girlfriend.

Against Portland State, James rushed for 227 yards on 14 carries and scored two touchdowns in a 69–0 shutout win, the Ducks' second shutout on the year. The next week, against Arizona State, James was held to only 94 rushing yards, but the total was enough to move James past the 2,000 yard mark for his career. Against the Arizona Wildcats, James rushed for 126 yards, 2 touchdowns and surpassed LeGarrette Blount's single season scoring record. James had a season high against the Stanford Cardinal by garnering 3 touchdowns, and 257 yards on 31 rushes. Over the course of the season, James had eclipsed the century mark 9 times, only failing to reach 100 yards twice. All in all James has had 18 100+ rushing yard games in his career, a record at the University of Oregon.

Despite missing the first game of the 2010 season, due to suspension, James managed to break the Pac-10 all-time sophomore single season rushing record, and led the country in both rushing yards (1,682) and touchdowns (22), ultimately earning a trip to the annual Heisman Ceremony in New York as a finalist.  Following James' 2010 season, he received the Doak Walker award, given to best running back in the country, and was recognized as a unanimous first-team All-American.  He was also a Pac-12 All-Academic selection.  The Ducks finished regular season play undefeated (12-0) and ranked No. 2 in both the BCS and the AP poll. They played the top-ranked Auburn Tigers in the 2011 BCS National Championship Game in Glendale, Arizona. In that game, James had two touchdown receptions, including one that set up the game-tying two-point conversion. Nevertheless, James' season ended with disappointment when Auburn kicked a game-winning field goal as time expired for a 22–19 win.

2011 season
In the first game of the 2011 season against LSU, James became Oregon's career rushing leader, surpassing the mark previously set by Derek Loville. In the third game of the season against Missouri State, James ran for 204 yards and three touchdowns, which was his 4th career 200+ yard rushing game.  On September 24 in a game against Arizona, James rushed for an Oregon single game record of 288 yards on 24 carries.

On October 6, 2011, in a game against California, James fell awkwardly on his right arm and left with an air cast. After the game, it was announced that X-rays were negative for a break and that he had suffered a dislocated elbow but popped it back into place before leaving the field. During the post game interview James' health for the next game came into question. James' response to questions about his health was: "I could tear all of my ACLs and I'll still play."

On December 2, 2011, James won the Pac-12 Championship Game MVP, while rushing for 3 touchdowns. On January 2, 2012, James rushed for 159 yards on 25 carries with one touchdown to help Oregon beat Wisconsin 45–38 in the Rose Bowl. In an interview with John Canzano of The Oregonian, James said of former Oregon Running Back coach Garry Campbell, "He’s authentic. When you have somebody that authentic, he’s not always going to tell you what you want to hear but he’s going to tell you what you need to hear...he’s a wonderful man on and off the field".

Track and field
James ran track while still in high school, winning the 2006 Texas 100 meter championship in 10.51 seconds. He was also the state runner-up in the 4x100 meter (42.28) and 4x400 meter (3:23.31) relay teams. He was also a track & field star at the University of Oregon. Despite limited workouts with school's track team, he placed 5th in the 2010 Pac-10 championships at the 100 meters, posting a personal-best time of 10.50 seconds in the semifinals. He anchored 4x100 relay to 4th place and ran a personal-best time of 6.77 seconds in the 60 meters at the 2010 Washington Husky Invitational, placing 3rd in the finals.

Professional career

San Francisco 49ers
James was drafted in the second round with the 61st overall pick by the San Francisco 49ers in the 2012 NFL Draft. His college success did not carry over to the NFL.

During his rookie season, James played in his first career regular-season game against the Miami Dolphins in Week 14. James finished the 27-13 victory with eight carries for 30 yards along with a 15-yard reception. In the next game against the New England Patriots, he had eight carries for 31 yards along with a 62-yard kickoff return after the Patriots had completed a 28-point comeback to tie the game 31-31, leading to a touchdown the next play for the 49ers. The 49ers won the game on the road by a score of 41-34. In the NFC Championship Game against the Atlanta Falcons, James rushed five times for 34 yards and scored his first NFL touchdown on a 15-yard rush as the 49ers won on the road by a score of 28-24 and reached Super Bowl XLVII. In the game, James rushed thrice for 10 yards but lost a fumble as the 49ers narrowly lost to the Baltimore Ravens by a score of 34–31.

Miami Dolphins
James was signed to the Miami Dolphins practice squad on September 30, 2014. He was promoted to the active roster on November 10, 2014, after a season-ending injury to left tackle Branden Albert.

James was re-signed by the Dolphins on March 20, 2015. Prior to the 2015 season, he informed the media that he preferred to be addressed as "LaMike", stating his friends, family and teammates have always called him that. James was waived by the Dolphins on September 14, 2015.

NFL career statistics

Regular season

Postseason

Awards and honors
 2010 Doak Walker Award
 2010 Heisman Trophy finalist (3rd)
 2010 Premier Player of College Football Trophy finalist (3rd)
 2010 AFCA All-American
 2010 First-team AP All-American
 2010 FWAA All-American
 2010 WCFF All-American
 2010 First-team All-Pac-10
 2010 Pac-10 First-team All-Academic
 2009 CFPA National Freshman Performer of the Year
 2009 Pac-10 Offensive Freshman of the Year
 2009 Sporting News Third-team All-American
 2009 AP Third-team All-American
 2009 Rivals.com Second-team All-MLG team
 Pac-10 Offensive Player of the Week, twice (October 31, 2009,

Personal life
James was born in New Boston, Texas to Rosemary James. He was raised by his maternal grandma, Betty James, in Texarkana, Texas. Betty James died of cancer when LaMichael James was 17 years old, so he had to live by himself during his junior and senior years of high school.

Post-Football life 
James turned himself into a restaurant franchise owner after his NFL playing days ended. As of 2022, he owned two Killer Burger stores in the state of Oregon, one located in Beaverton and the other located in Lake Oswego, and planned to open a third franchise store in the same city as his alma mater, Eugene.

See also
 List of Division I FBS rushing touchdown leaders
 List of college football yearly rushing leaders

References

External links
 San Francisco 49ers profile
 Oregon profile
 

1989 births
Living people
All-American college football players
American football running backs
Oregon Ducks football players
People from Texarkana, Texas
Players of American football from Texas
San Francisco 49ers players
Miami Dolphins players
People from New Boston, Texas
Oregon Ducks men's track and field athletes